The 1896–97 season was the third in the history of the Southern League. Southampton St.Mary's won the Division One championship. Millwall Athletic applied for election to Football League. However, they were not elected.

Division One

Division One featured seven teams from previous season and five new clubs: two promoted from Division Two and three newly elected members.

Teams promoted from Division Two:
 Wolverston L&NWR - champions, winners of testing matches
 Sheppey United - runners-up, winners of testing matches
Newly promoted teams:
 Northfleet - Kent League champions
 Gravesend United - Kent League members
 Tottenham Hotspur

Division Two

Division Two featured five teams from previous season and eight new clubs, all of which were newly elected.

Newly promoted teams:
 Dartford - Kent League members
 RETB Chatham - Kent League members
 1st Coldstream Guards 
 Freemantle
 Southall
 Warmley
 West Herts
 Wycombe Wanderers

Promotion-relegation test matches
At the end of the season, test matches were held between the bottom three clubs in Division One and the top three clubs in Division Two. Third-placed Freemantle were the only Division Two club to win, but withdrew from the league at the end of season, meaning their defeated opponents Northfleet remained in Division One.

Football League elections
Only one Southern League club, Millwall Athletic, applied for election to Division Two of the Football League. However, they received only one vote and were not elected.

References

External links
Southern League First Division Tables at RSSSF
Southern League Second Division Tables at RSSSF

1896-97
1896–97 in English association football leagues